This is a list of notable Shinto shrines in Japan. There are tens of thousands of shrines in Japan. Shrines with structures that are National Treasures of Japan are covered by the List of National Treasures of Japan (shrines). For Shinto shrines in other countries, scroll down to the See also section.

Shinto shrines from specific sects or new churches are not included in this list.

Hokkaidō and Tōhoku

Hokkaidō

 Asahikawa Shrine
 Ebetsu Jinja
 Hakodate Hachiman Shrine
 Hokkaidō Gokoku Shrine
 Hokkaidō Jingu
 Itsukushima Jinja
 Kamikawa Shrine
 Nishino Shrine
 Obihiro Shrine
 Sapporo Hachimangū
 Shiraoi Hachiman Shrine
 Sumiyoshi Shrine
 Tarumaezan Shrine

Aomori

 Kushihiki Hachimangū
 Iwakiyama Jinja
 Saruka Jinja
 Uramachi Shinmeigū
 Utou Shrine
 Yanemori Hachimangū

Iwate

 Komagata Shrine
 Morioka Hachiman Shrine

Miyagi

 Aoso Shrine
 Atago Shrine
 Furukawa Shrine
 Futahashira Shrine
 Ōsaki Hachiman-gū
 Hayama Shrine
 Kamo Shrine
 Kashima Miko Shrine
 Kifuso Shrine
 Kumano Shrine
 Miyagiken Gokoku Shrine
 Myojin Shrine
 Ohtakayama Shrine
 Ohkuni Shrine
 Sendai Tōshō-gū
 Shiogama Shrine
 Shirahige Shrine
 Sumiyoshi Shrine
 Tsubonuma Hachiman Shrine
 Usa Jingū
 Washikura Shrine
 Yakurai Shrine

Akita

 Koshiō Shrine
 Sanko Kumano Shrine
 Sanko Shrine
 Kumano Shrine
 Tsuchizaki Shinmeisha

Yamagata

 Chokaisan Omonoimi Shrine
 Dewa Sanzan (Three Mountains of Dewa)
 Gassan Shrine
 Yudonosan Shrine
 Hagurosan Shrine
 Higashimachi Kodai Shrine
 Kumano Shrine
 Torigoe Hachiman Shrine
 Tsukioka Shrine
 Uesugi Shrine

Fukushima

 Chinju Hachiman Shrine
 Iino Hachimangū
 Isasumi Shrine
 Kashima Shrine
 Kogaikuni Shrine
 Okaburaya Shrine
 Ryōzen Shrine
 Sumiyoshi Shrine
 Tsutsukowake Shrine

Kantō

Tochigi

 Futarasan Shrine
 Nikkō Tōshō-gū

Ibaraki

 Hitachinokuni Sōshagū
 Kasama Inari Shrine
 Kashima Jingū
 Oarai Isosaki Shrine
 Sakatsura Isosaki Shrine
 Tokiwa Shrine
 Tsukubasan Shrine

Gunma

 Agatsuma Shrine
 Haruna Shrine
 Nakanotake Shrine
 Isemachi Jingu
 Nukisaki Shrine

Saitama

 Chichibu Shrine
 Washinomiya Shrine
 Hikawa Shrine

Chiba

 Awa Shrine
 Chiba Shrine
 Funabashi Shrine
 Katori Shrine
 Komikado Shrine
 Shibayama Jinja
 Tamasaki Shrine

Tokyo

 Asakusa Shrine
 Atago Shrine
 Hanazono Shrine
 Hie Shrine
 Hikawa Shrine
 Kanda Shrine
 Kume no Heinai-dō
 Meiji Shrine
 Namiyoke Inari Shrine
 Nezu Shrine
 Nogi Shrine
 Oji Shrine
 Okunitama Shrine
 Ōmiya Hachiman Shrine
 Shōin shrine
 Suiten-gū
 Three Palace Sanctuaries, Kokyo Imperial Palace
 Tokyo Daijingu
 Tsukudo Shrine
 Togo Shrine
 Toyokawa Inari Shrine
 Yasukuni Shrine
 Yushima Tenmangū

Kanagawa

 Egara Tenjin Shrine
 Enoshima Shrine
 Ooyama Aburi Shrine
 Hakone Shrine
 Hōtoku Ninomiya Shrine
 Samukawa Shrine
 Tsurugaoka Hachiman Shrine

Shin'etsu and Hokuriku

Niigata

 Amatsu-jinja  
 Kota-jinja
 Watatsu-jinja
 Yahiko-jinja

Toyama

 Imizu Shrine
 Oyama Shrine
 Takase Shrine
 Toyamaken Gokoku Shrine

Ishikawa

 Keta Taisha
 Onominato Shrine
 Oyama Shrine
 Shirayama Hime Shrine

Fukui

 Fujishima Shrine
Kanegasaki-gū
 Kehi Shrine
 Ōshio Hachiman Shrine
 Wakasahiko Shrine

Tōkai

Yamanashi

 Asama Shrine
 Takeda Shrine

Nagano

 Suwa Shrine
 Togakushi Shrine

Gifu

 Inaba Shrine
 Keta Wakamiya Shrine
 Minashi Shrine
 Nangū Taisha
 Yōrō Shrine

Shizuoka

 Fujisan Hongū Sengen Taisha
 Iinoya-gū
 Mishima Taisha
 Shizuoka Sengen Shrine

Aichi

 Aichi Prefecture Gokoku Shrine
 Atsuta Shrine
 Masumida Shrine
 Ogake Shrine
 Rokusho Shrine (Okazaki)
 Rokusho Shrine (Toyota)
 Tsushima Shrine
 Tagata Shrine

Kinki

Mie

 Ise Shrine
 Kitabatake Shrine
 Tado Shrine
 Tsubaki Ōkami Yashiro
 Yūki Shrine

Shiga

 Hiyoshi Taisha
 Omi Jingu
 Taga Taisha
 Takebe Taisha
 Tsukubusuma Shrine

Kyoto

 Atago Shrine
 Fushimi Inari-taisha
 Heian Jingu
 Hirano Shrine
 Imamiya Shrine
 Iwashimizu Hachimangu
 Kamo Shrine
 Kamo Wakeikazuchi Shrine (Kamigamo Shrine)
 Kamo Mioya Shrine (Shimogamo Shrine)
 Kibune Shrine
 Kitano Tenmangu
 Kono Shrine
 Kyoto Ryozen Gokoku Shrine
 Matsunoo Taisha
 Nishiki Tenmangū
 Saginomori Shrine
 Tsukiyomi Shrine
 Yasaka Shrine
 Yoshida Shrine

Osaka

 Abeno Shrine
 Hattori Tenjin Shrine
 Hiraoka Shrine
 Ikasuri Shrine
 Ikukunitama Shrine
 Imamiya Ebisu Shrine
 Mitami Shrine
 Ōsaka Tenmangū Shrine
 Sakurai Shrine (Sakai)
 Shijōnawate Shrine
 Sumiyoshi Taisha
 Tsuboi Hachimangū
 Tsunashiki Tenjin Shrine

Hyōgo

 Hirota Shrine
 Ikuta Shrine
 Izushi jinja
 Koshikiiwa Shrine
 Mefu Jinja
 Minatogawa Shrine
 Nagata Shrine
 Nishinomiya Shrine
 Sumiyoshi Shrine

Nara

 Himuro Shrine
 Ikoma Jinja
 Isonokami Jingu
 Kashihara Jingu
 Kasuga Taisha
 Mishima Jinja
 Oomiwa Shrine
 Tamukeyama Hachiman Shrine
 Yoshino Mikumari Shrine

Wakayama
 Hinokuma Shrine
 Kamayama Shrine
 Kumano Three Shrines (Kumano Sanzan)
 Kumano Hayatama Taisha
 Kumano Hongū Taisha
 Kumano Nachi Taisha

Chūgoku

Tottori
 Shitori Shrine
 Ube shrine

Shimane

 Hinomisaki Shrine
 Kannbashira Shrine
 Miho Jinja
 Yaegaki Shrine
 Izumo Taisha
 Kumano Taisha
 Susa Shrine

Okayama

 Kibitsu Shrine
 Kibitsuhiko Shrine
 Nakayama Shrine
 Saijo Inari
 Shiro Shrine
 Tsurusaki Shrine
 Yuga Shrine

Hiroshima

 Fukuyama Hachimangū
 Hiroshima Gokoku Shrine
 Itsukushima Shrine
 Sakakiyama Shrine

Yamaguchi

 Akama Shrine
 Hikoshima Hachimangu
 Kameyama Hachimangū

Shikoku

Tokushima
 Ōasahiko Shrine

Kagawa

 Kotohira Gu
 Kagawa Gokoku Shrine

Ehime

 Isaniwa Jinja
 Isono Shrine
 Izumtaisha Matsuyama Shrine
 Mishima Shrine
 Taga Shrine
 Takashihime Shrine
 Yu Shrine
 Ōyamazumi Shrine

Kōchi

 Kochi Daijingu
 Shimosaki Shrine

Kyūshū and Okinawa

Fukuoka

 Dazaifu Tenman-gū
 Furogu
 Hakozakigu
 Hikosan Shrine
 Imaizu Susa Shrine
 Itouzu Hachiman Shrine
 Kamado Shrine
 Kashii Shrine
 Kurume Suitengu
 Kushida Shrine
 Mekari Shrine
 Miyajidake Shrine
 Munakata Taisha
 Hetsu-gū
 Nakatsu-gū
 Okitsu-gū
 Myokengu
 Sugawara Shrine
 Takami Shrine
 Takasu Shrine
 Tanabata Shrine
 Tonoe Shrine
 Umi Hachimangu

Saga

 Araho Shrine
 Chiriku Hachiman Shrine
 Hoto Shrine
 Ise Jinja
 Kushidagu
 Saga Shrine
 Tōzan Shrine
 Yūtoku Inari Shrine

Nagasaki

 Sanno Shrine
 Suwa Shrine

Kumamoto

 Aoi Aso Shrine
 Aso Shrine
 Fujisaki Hachimangu
 Kato Shrine
 Kengun Shrine
 Kikuchi Shrine
 Heitate Shrine
 Hikino Shrine
 Takahashi Inari Shrine
 Yatsushiro-gū

Ōita

 Komo Shrine
 Usa Jingu

Miyazaki

 Amanoiwato Shrine
 Aoshima Shrine
 Miyazaki Jingū
 Mikado Shrine
 Mukabaki Shrine
 Takachiho Shrine
 Tsuno Shrine
 Udo Jingū

Kagoshima

 Hirakiki Shrine
 Kagoshima Shrine
 Terukuni Shrine
 Kirishima Shrine
 Minakata Shrine

Okinawa
 Naminoue Shrine

See also
List of Jingū
List of Shinto shrines in Taiwan
List of Shinto shrines in the United States
Nan'yō Shrine (Palau)
Chokusaisha

Citations

General references 
 Ponsonby-Fane, Richard Arthur Brabazon. (1962)   Studies in Shinto and Shrines. Kyoto: Ponsonby Memorial Society. .
 Ponsonby-Fane, Richard Arthur Brabazon (1963). Vicissitudes of Shinto. Kyoto: Ponsonby Memorial Society. .

 
Japan
Shinto shrines